The siege of Minamata Castle was a short siege of the castle of Minamata.

Minamata was the entry point for the Ōtomo lands in Higo province, the castle was guarded by Sagara Yoshihi with 700 soldiers. 

When Shimazu Toshihisa and Iehisa encamped near the castle with 115,000 men, Yoshihi was forced to surrender.

Later, Yoshihi was killed in a surprise attack by Kai Soun's army in the Battle of Hibikinohara.

References

Battles of the Sengoku period
1581 in Japan
Shimazu clan
Sieges involving Japan
Conflicts in 1581